is a passenger railway station located in Kita-ku, Saitama, Japan, operated by the Saitama New Urban Transit Company.

Lines 

Station layout
This elevated station consists of two opposite side platforms serving two tracks, located on either side of the Tōhoku/Jōetsu Shinkansen lines. The station building is located underneath the platforms.

History
The station opened on 22 December 1983.

Passenger statistics
In fiscal 2016, the station was used by an average of 2777 passengers daily (boarding passengers only).

Surrounding area
 
 Former Nakasendo highway
 Toro Station (Utsunomiya Line)

See also
 List of railway stations in Japan

References

External links

 Station information 

Railway stations in Saitama Prefecture
Railway stations in Japan opened in 1983
Railway stations in Saitama (city)